Elections to Calderdale Metropolitan Borough Council were held on 4 May 2000.  One third of the council was up for election and the Conservative party gained overall control of the council from no overall control. The total turnout of the election was 28.97% (40,190 voters of an electorate of 138,748). The winning candidate in each ward is highlighted in bold.

After the election, the composition of the council was
Conservative 28
Liberal Democrats 15
Labour 10
Independent 1

Ward results

Brighouse ward

Calder Valley ward

Elland ward

Greetland and Stainland ward

Hipperholme and Lightcliffe ward

Illingworth ward

Luddendenfoot ward

Mixenden ward

Northowram and Shelf ward

Ovenden ward

Rastrick ward

Ryburn ward

Skircoat ward

Sowerby Bridge ward

St John's ward

Todmorden ward

Town ward

Warley ward

References 

Election of Local Councillors 2000. calderdale.gov.uk.
Calderdale Election Results. The Halifax Evening Courier.
Tories storm into power. The Halifax Evening Courier.

2000
2000 English local elections
2000s in West Yorkshire